Uranus is the seventh planet from the Sun. It is named after Greek sky deity Uranus (Caelus), who in Greek mythology is the father of Cronus (Saturn), a grandfather of Zeus (Jupiter) and great-grandfather of Ares (Mars). Uranus has the third-largest planetary radius and fourth-largest planetary mass in the Solar System. The planet is similar in composition to Neptune, and both have bulk chemical compositions which differ from those of the other two giant planets, Jupiter and Saturn (the gas giants). For this reason, scientists often distinguish Uranus and Neptune as "ice giants". 

As with gas giants, ice giants lack a well-defined solid surface. Uranus's atmosphere is similar to Jupiter's and Saturn's in its primary composition of hydrogen and helium, but it contains more "ices" such as water, ammonia, and methane, along with traces of other hydrocarbons. It has a complex, layered cloud structure; water is thought to make up the lowest clouds and methane the uppermost layer. The planet's interior is mainly composed of ices and rock.

Like the other giant planets, Uranus has a ring system, a magnetosphere, and numerous moons. The Uranian system has a unique configuration because its axis of rotation is tilted sideways, nearly into the plane of its solar orbit. Therefore, its north and south poles lie where most other planets have their equators. In 1986, images from Voyager 2 showed Uranus as an almost featureless planet in visible light, without the cloud bands or storms associated with the other giant planets. No other spacecraft has yet visited the planet. Observations from Earth have shown seasonal change and increased weather activity as Uranus approached its equinox in 2007. Wind speeds can reach .

History 

Like the classical planets, Uranus is visible to the naked eye, but it was never recognised as a planet by ancient observers because of its dimness and slow orbit. Sir William Herschel first observed Uranus on 13 March 1781, leading to its discovery as a planet, expanding the known boundaries of the Solar System for the first time in history and making Uranus the first planet classified as such with the aid of a telescope.

Discovery 

Uranus had been observed on many occasions before its recognition as a planet, but it was generally mistaken for a star. Possibly the earliest known observation was by Hipparchos, who in 128 BC might have recorded it as a star for his star catalogue that was later incorporated into Ptolemy's Almagest. The earliest definite sighting was in 1690, when John Flamsteed observed it at least six times, cataloguing it as 34 Tauri. The French astronomer Pierre Charles Le Monnier observed Uranus at least twelve times between 1750 and 1769, including on four consecutive nights.

Sir William Herschel observed Uranus on 13 March 1781 from the garden of his house at 19 New King Street in Bath, Somerset, England (now the Herschel Museum of Astronomy), and initially reported it (on 26 April 1781) as a comet. With a homemade 6.2-inch reflecting telescope, Herschel "engaged in a series of observations on the parallax of the fixed stars."

Herschel recorded in his journal: "In the quartile near ζ Tauri ... either [a] Nebulous star or perhaps a comet." On 17 March he noted: "I looked for the Comet or Nebulous Star and found that it is a Comet, for it has changed its place." When he presented his discovery to the Royal Society, he continued to assert that he had found a comet, but also implicitly compared it to a planet:

Herschel notified the Astronomer Royal Nevil Maskelyne of his discovery and received this flummoxed reply from him on 23 April 1781: "I don't know what to call it. It is as likely to be a regular planet moving in an orbit nearly circular to the sun as a Comet moving in a very eccentric ellipsis. I have not yet seen any coma or tail to it."

Although Herschel continued to describe his new object as a comet, other astronomers had already begun to suspect otherwise. Finnish-Swedish astronomer Anders Johan Lexell, working in Russia, was the first to compute the orbit of the new object. Its nearly circular orbit led him to a conclusion that it was a planet rather than a comet. Berlin astronomer Johann Elert Bode described Herschel's discovery as "a moving star that can be deemed a hitherto unknown planet-like object circulating beyond the orbit of Saturn". Bode concluded that its near-circular orbit was more like a planet's than a comet's.

The object was soon universally accepted as a new planet. By 1783, Herschel acknowledged this to Royal Society president Joseph Banks: "By the observation of the most eminent Astronomers in Europe it appears that the new star, which I had the honour of pointing out to them in March 1781, is a Primary Planet of our Solar System." In recognition of his achievement, King George III gave Herschel an annual stipend of £200 on condition that he move to Windsor so that the Royal Family could look through his telescopes.

Name 
It is the only one of the eight planets whose English name derives from a figure of Greek mythology. The adjectival form of Uranus is "Uranian".

Consensus on the name was not reached until almost 70 years after the planet's discovery. In response to Maskelyne's request, Herschel decided to name the object  (George's Star), or the "Georgian Planet" in honour of his new patron, King George III. He explained this decision in a letter to Joseph Banks:

Herschel's proposed name was not popular outside of Britain and Hanover, and alternatives were soon proposed. Astronomer Jérôme Lalande proposed that it be named Herschel in honour of its discoverer. Swedish astronomer Erik Prosperin proposed the name Neptune, which was supported by other astronomers who liked the idea to commemorate the victories of the British Royal Naval fleet in the course of the American Revolutionary War by calling the new planet even Neptune George III or Neptune Great Britain.

In a March 1782 treatise, Bode proposed Uranus, the Latinised version of the Greek god of the sky, Ouranos. Bode argued that the name should follow the mythology so as not to stand out as different from the other planets, and that Uranus was an appropriate name as the father of the first generation of the Titans. He also noted that elegance of the name in that just as Saturn was the father of Jupiter, the new planet should be named after the father of Saturn. Bode was however apparently unaware that Uranus was only the Latinised form of the titular deity, and his Roman equivalent was Caelus. In 1789, Bode's Royal Academy colleague Martin Klaproth named his newly discovered element uranium in support of Bode's choice. Ultimately, Bode's suggestion became the most widely used, and became universal in 1850 when HM Nautical Almanac Office, the final holdout, switched from using Georgium Sidus to Uranus.

Uranus has two astronomical symbols. The first to be proposed, was proposed by Johann Gottfried Köhler at Bode's request in 1782. Köhler suggested that the new planet be given the symbol for platinum, which had been described scientifically only 30 years before. As there was no alchemical symbol for platinum, he suggested ⛢ or ⛢, a combination of the planetary-metal symbols ☉ (gold) and ♂ (iron), as platinum (or 'white gold') is found mixed with iron. Bode thought that an upright orientation, ⛢, fit better with the symbols for the other planets while remaining distinct. This symbol predominates in modern astronomical use in the rare cases that symbols are used at all. The second symbol, was suggested by Lalande in 1784. In a letter to Herschel, Lalande described it as "" ("a globe surmounted by the first letter of your surname"). The second symbol is nearly universal in astrology.

Uranus is called by a variety of names in other languages. In Chinese, Japanese, Korean, and Vietnamese, its name is literally translated as the "sky king star".

Orbit and rotation 
Uranus orbits the Sun once every 84 years. In 2033, the planet will have made its third complete orbit around the Sun since being discovered in 1781. The planet has returned to the point of its discovery northeast of Zeta Tauri twice since then, on 25 March 1865 and 29 March 1949. Uranus will return to this location again on 3 April 2033. The difference between its minimum and maximum distance from the Sun is 1.8 AU, larger than that of any other planet, though not as large as that of dwarf planet Pluto. The intensity of sunlight varies inversely with the square of distance, and so on Uranus (at about 20 times the distance from the Sun compared to Earth) it is about 1/400 the intensity of light on Earth.

The orbital elements of Uranus were first calculated in 1783 by Pierre-Simon Laplace. With time, discrepancies began to appear between the predicted and observed orbits, and in 1841, John Couch Adams first proposed that the differences might be due to the gravitational tug of an unseen planet. In 1845, Urbain Le Verrier began his own independent research into Uranus's orbit. On 23 September 1846, Johann Gottfried Galle located a new planet, later named Neptune, at nearly the position predicted by Le Verrier.

The rotational period of the interior of Uranus is 17 hours, 14 minutes. As on all the giant planets, its upper atmosphere experiences strong winds in the direction of rotation. At some latitudes, such as about 60 degrees south, visible features of the atmosphere move much faster, making a full rotation in as little as 14 hours.

Axial tilt 

The Uranian axis of rotation is approximately parallel with the plane of the Solar System, with an axial tilt of 97.77° (as defined by prograde rotation). This gives it seasonal changes completely unlike those of the other planets. Near the solstice, one pole faces the Sun continuously and the other faces away, with only a narrow strip around the equator experiencing a rapid day–night cycle, with the Sun low over the horizon. At the other side of Uranus's orbit the orientation of the poles towards the Sun is reversed. Each pole gets around 42 years of continuous sunlight, followed by 42 years of darkness. Near the time of the equinoxes, the Sun faces the equator of Uranus giving a period of day–night cycles similar to those seen on most of the other planets.

One result of this axis orientation is that, averaged over the Uranian year, the near-polar regions of Uranus receive a greater energy input from the Sun than its equatorial regions. Nevertheless, Uranus is hotter at its equator than at its poles. The underlying mechanism that causes this is unknown. The reason for Uranus's unusual axial tilt is also not known with certainty, but the usual speculation is that during the formation of the Solar System, an Earth-sized protoplanet collided with Uranus, causing the skewed orientation. Research by Jacob Kegerreis of Durham University suggests that the tilt resulted from a rock larger than the Earth crashing into the planet 3 to 4 billion years ago.
Uranus's south pole was pointed almost directly at the Sun at the time of Voyager 2 flyby in 1986. The labelling of this pole as "south" uses the definition currently endorsed by the International Astronomical Union, namely that the north pole of a planet or satellite is the pole that points above the invariable plane of the Solar System, regardless of the direction the planet is spinning. A different convention is sometimes used, in which a body's north and south poles are defined according to the right-hand rule in relation to the direction of rotation.

Visibility 

The mean apparent magnitude of Uranus is 5.68 with a standard deviation of 0.17, while the extremes are 5.38 and 6.03. This range of brightness is near the limit of naked eye visibility. Much of the variability is dependent upon the planetary latitudes being illuminated from the Sun and viewed from the Earth. Its angular diameter is between 3.4 and 3.7 arcseconds, compared with 16 to 20 arcseconds for Saturn and 32 to 45 arcseconds for Jupiter. At opposition, Uranus is visible to the naked eye in dark skies, and becomes an easy target even in urban conditions with binoculars. In larger amateur telescopes with an objective diameter of between 15 and 23 cm, Uranus appears as a pale cyan disk with distinct limb darkening. With a large telescope of 25 cm or wider, cloud patterns, as well as some of the larger satellites, such as Titania and Oberon, may be visible.

Physical characteristics

Internal structure 

Uranus's mass is roughly 14.5 times that of Earth, making it the least massive of the giant planets. Its diameter is slightly larger than Neptune's at roughly four times that of Earth. A resulting density of 1.27 g/cm3 makes Uranus the second least dense planet, after Saturn. This value indicates that it is made primarily of various ices, such as water, ammonia, and methane. The total mass of ice in Uranus's interior is not precisely known, because different figures emerge depending on the model chosen; it must be between 9.3 and 13.5 Earth masses. Hydrogen and helium constitute only a small part of the total, with between 0.5 and 1.5 Earth masses. The remainder of the non-ice mass (0.5 to 3.7 Earth masses) is accounted for by rocky material.

The standard model of Uranus's structure is that it consists of three layers: a rocky (silicate/iron–nickel) core in the centre, an icy mantle in the middle and an outer gaseous hydrogen/helium envelope. The core is relatively small, with a mass of only 0.55 Earth masses and a radius less than 20% of Uranus'; the mantle comprises its bulk, with around 13.4 Earth masses, and the upper atmosphere is relatively insubstantial, weighing about 0.5 Earth masses and extending for the last 20% of Uranus's radius. Uranus's core density is around 9 g/cm3, with a pressure in the centre of 8 million bars (800 GPa) and a temperature of about 5000 K. The ice mantle is not in fact composed of ice in the conventional sense, but of a hot and dense fluid consisting of water, ammonia and other volatiles. This fluid, which has a high electrical conductivity, is sometimes called a water–ammonia ocean.

The extreme pressure and temperature deep within Uranus may break up the methane molecules, with the carbon atoms condensing into crystals of diamond that rain down through the mantle like hailstones. This phenomenon is similar to diamond rains that are theorised by scientists to exist on Jupiter, Saturn, and Neptune. Very-high-pressure experiments at the Lawrence Livermore National Laboratory suggest that the base of the mantle may comprise an ocean of metallic liquid carbon, perhaps with floating solid 'diamond-bergs'.

The bulk compositions of Uranus and Neptune are different from those of Jupiter and Saturn, with ice dominating over gases, hence justifying their separate classification as ice giants. There may be a layer of ionic water where the water molecules break down into a soup of hydrogen and oxygen ions, and deeper down superionic water in which the oxygen crystallises but the hydrogen ions move freely within the oxygen lattice.

Although the model considered above is reasonably standard, it is not unique; other models also satisfy observations. For instance, if substantial amounts of hydrogen and rocky material are mixed in the ice mantle, the total mass of ices in the interior will be lower, and, correspondingly, the total mass of rocks and hydrogen will be higher. Presently available data does not allow a scientific determination of which model is correct. The fluid interior structure of Uranus means that it has no solid surface. The gaseous atmosphere gradually transitions into the internal liquid layers. For the sake of convenience, a revolving oblate spheroid set at the point at which atmospheric pressure equals 1 bar (100 kPa) is conditionally designated as a "surface". This surface is used throughout this article as a zero point for altitudes.

Internal heat 
Uranus's internal heat appears markedly lower than that of the other giant planets; in astronomical terms, it has a low thermal flux. Why Uranus's internal temperature is so low is still not understood. Neptune, which is Uranus's near twin in size and composition, radiates 2.61 times as much energy into space as it receives from the Sun, but Uranus radiates hardly any excess heat at all. The total power radiated by Uranus in the far infrared (i.e. heat) part of the spectrum is  times the solar energy absorbed in its atmosphere.

One of the hypotheses for this discrepancy suggests that when Uranus was hit by a supermassive impactor, which caused it to expel most of its primordial heat, it was left with a depleted core temperature. This impact hypothesis is also used in some attempts to explain the planet's axial tilt. Another hypothesis is that some form of barrier exists in Uranus's upper layers that prevents the core's heat from reaching the surface. For example, convection may take place in a set of compositionally different layers, which may inhibit the upward heat transport; perhaps double diffusive convection is a limiting factor.

In a 2021 study the ice giants' interior conditions were mimicked by compressing water containing minerals like olivine and ferropericlase, thus showing that large amounts of magnesium could be dissolved in the liquid interiors of Uranus and Neptune. If Uranus has more of this magnesium than Neptune it could form a thermal insulation layer, thus potentially explaining the planet's low temperature.

Atmosphere 

Although there is no well-defined solid surface within Uranus's interior, the outermost part of Uranus's gaseous envelope that is accessible to remote sensing is called its atmosphere. The tenuous thermosphere extends over two planetary radii from the nominal surface, which is defined to lie at a pressure of 1 bar. There is no mesosphere.

Composition 
The composition of Uranus's atmosphere is different from its bulk, consisting mainly of molecular hydrogen and helium. The third-most-abundant component of Uranus's atmosphere is methane. Methane has prominent absorption bands in the visible and near-infrared (IR), making Uranus aquamarine or cyan in colour. The mixing ratio is much lower in the upper atmosphere due to its extremely low temperature, which lowers the saturation level and causes excess methane to freeze out. The abundances of less volatile compounds such as ammonia, water, and hydrogen sulfide in the deep atmosphere are poorly known. They are probably also higher than solar values. Along with methane, trace amounts of various hydrocarbons are found in the stratosphere of Uranus, which are thought to be produced from methane by photolysis induced by the solar ultraviolet (UV) radiation. They include ethane, acetylene, methylacetylene, and diacetylene. Spectroscopy has also uncovered traces of water vapour, carbon monoxide and carbon dioxide in the upper atmosphere, which can only originate from an external source such as infalling dust and comets.

Troposphere 
The troposphere is the lowest and densest part of the atmosphere and is characterised by a decrease in temperature with altitude. The temperatures in the coldest upper region of the troposphere (the tropopause) actually vary in the range between  depending on planetary latitude.

The troposphere is a dynamic part of the atmosphere, exhibiting strong winds, bright clouds and seasonal changes.

Upper atmosphere 

The heating of the stratosphere is caused by absorption of solar UV and IR radiation by methane and other hydrocarbons, which form in this part of the atmosphere as a result of methane photolysis. Heat is also conducted from the hot thermosphere.

The most abundant hydrocarbons are methane, acetylene and ethane with mixing ratios of around  relative to hydrogen. The mixing ratio of carbon monoxide is similar at these altitudes. Heavier hydrocarbons and carbon dioxide have mixing ratios three orders of magnitude lower. The abundance ratio of water is around 7. Ethane and acetylene tend to condense in the colder lower part of stratosphere and tropopause (below 10 mBar level) forming haze layers, which may be partly responsible for the bland appearance of Uranus. The concentration of hydrocarbons in the Uranian stratosphere above the haze is significantly lower than in the stratospheres of the other giant planets.

The outermost layer of the Uranian atmosphere is the thermosphere and corona, which has a uniform temperature around 800 to 850 K. The heat sources necessary to sustain such a high level are not understood, as neither the solar UV nor the auroral activity can provide the necessary energy to maintain these temperatures. The weak cooling efficiency due to the lack of hydrocarbons in the stratosphere above 0.1 mBar pressure level may contribute too. In addition to molecular hydrogen, the thermosphere-corona contains many free hydrogen atoms. This extended corona is a unique feature of Uranus. Its effects include a drag on small particles orbiting Uranus, causing a general depletion of dust in the Uranian rings. The Uranian thermosphere, together with the upper part of the stratosphere, corresponds to the ionosphere of Uranus. The Uranian ionosphere is denser than that of either Saturn or Neptune, which may arise from the low concentration of hydrocarbons in the stratosphere. The ionosphere is mainly sustained by solar UV radiation and its density depends on the solar activity. Auroral activity is insignificant as compared to Jupiter and Saturn.

Magnetosphere 

Before the arrival of Voyager 2, no measurements of the Uranian magnetosphere had been taken, so its nature remained a mystery. Before 1986, scientists had expected the magnetic field of Uranus to be in line with the solar wind, because it would then align with Uranus's poles that lie in the ecliptic.

Voyagers observations revealed that Uranus's magnetic field is peculiar, both because it does not originate from its geometric centre, and because it is tilted at 59° from the axis of rotation. In fact the magnetic dipole is shifted from Uranus's centre towards the south rotational pole by as much as one third of the planetary radius. This unusual geometry results in a highly asymmetric magnetosphere, where the magnetic field strength on the surface in the southern hemisphere can be as low as 0.1 gauss (10 µT), whereas in the northern hemisphere it can be as high as 1.1 gauss (110 µT). The average field at the surface is 0.23 gauss (23 µT).

Studies of Voyager 2 data in 2017 suggest that this asymmetry causes Uranus's magnetosphere to connect with the solar wind once a Uranian day, opening the planet to the Sun's particles. In comparison, the magnetic field of Earth is roughly as strong at either pole, and its "magnetic equator" is roughly parallel with its geographical equator. The dipole moment of Uranus is 50 times that of Earth. Neptune has a similarly displaced and tilted magnetic field, suggesting that this may be a common feature of ice giants. One hypothesis is that, unlike the magnetic fields of the terrestrial and gas giants, which are generated within their cores, the ice giants' magnetic fields are generated by motion at relatively shallow depths, for instance, in the water–ammonia ocean. Another possible explanation for the magnetosphere's alignment is that there are oceans of liquid diamond in Uranus's interior that would deter the magnetic field.

Despite its curious alignment, in other respects the Uranian magnetosphere is like those of other planets: it has a bow shock at about 23 Uranian radii ahead of it, a magnetopause at 18 Uranian radii, a fully developed magnetotail, and radiation belts. Overall, the structure of Uranus's magnetosphere is different from Jupiter's and more similar to Saturn's. Uranus's magnetotail trails behind it into space for millions of kilometres and is twisted by its sideways rotation into a long corkscrew.

Uranus's magnetosphere contains charged particles: mainly protons and electrons, with a small amount of H2+ ions. Many of these particles probably derive from the thermosphere. The ion and electron energies can be as high as 4 and 1.2 megaelectronvolts, respectively. The density of low-energy (below 1 kiloelectronvolt) ions in the inner magnetosphere is about 2 cm−3. The particle population is strongly affected by the Uranian moons, which sweep through the magnetosphere, leaving noticeable gaps. The particle flux is high enough to cause darkening or space weathering of their surfaces on an astronomically rapid timescale of 100,000 years. This may be the cause of the uniformly dark colouration of the Uranian satellites and rings. Uranus has relatively well developed aurorae, which are seen as bright arcs around both magnetic poles. Unlike Jupiter's, Uranus's aurorae seem to be insignificant for the energy balance of the planetary thermosphere. In March 2020, NASA astronomers reported the detection of a large atmospheric magnetic bubble, also known as a plasmoid, released into outer space from the planet Uranus, after reevaluating old data recorded by the Voyager 2 space probe during a flyby of the planet in 1986.

Climate 

At ultraviolet and visible wavelengths, Uranus's atmosphere is bland in comparison to the other giant planets, even to Neptune, which it otherwise closely resembles. When Voyager 2 flew by Uranus in 1986, it observed a total of ten cloud features across the entire planet. One proposed explanation for this dearth of features is that Uranus's internal heat is markedly lower than that of the other giant planets, as stated previously Uranus is the coldest planet in the Solar System.

Banded structure, winds and clouds 

In 1986, Voyager 2 found that the visible southern hemisphere of Uranus can be subdivided into two regions: a bright polar cap and dark equatorial bands. Their boundary is located at about −45° of latitude. A narrow band straddling the latitudinal range from −45 to −50° is the brightest large feature on its visible surface. It is called a southern "collar". The cap and collar are thought to be a dense region of methane clouds located within the pressure range of 1.3 to 2 bar (see above). Besides the large-scale banded structure, Voyager 2 observed ten small bright clouds, most lying several degrees to the north from the collar. In all other respects Uranus looked like a dynamically dead planet in 1986.

Voyager 2 arrived during the height of Uranus's southern summer and could not observe the northern hemisphere. At the beginning of the 21st century, when the northern polar region came into view, the Hubble Space Telescope (HST) and Keck telescope initially observed neither a collar nor a polar cap in the northern hemisphere. So Uranus appeared to be asymmetric: bright near the south pole and uniformly dark in the region north of the southern collar. In 2007, when Uranus passed its equinox, the southern collar almost disappeared, and a faint northern collar emerged near 45° of latitude.

In the 1990s, the number of the observed bright cloud features grew considerably partly because new high-resolution imaging techniques became available. Most were found in the northern hemisphere as it started to become visible. An early explanation—that bright clouds are easier to identify in its dark part, whereas in the southern hemisphere the bright collar masks them – was shown to be incorrect. Nevertheless, there are differences between the clouds of each hemisphere. The northern clouds are smaller, sharper and brighter. They appear to lie at a higher altitude. The lifetime of clouds spans several orders of magnitude. Some small clouds live for hours; at least one southern cloud may have persisted since the Voyager 2 flyby. Recent observation also discovered that cloud features on Uranus have a lot in common with those on Neptune. For example, the dark spots common on Neptune had never been observed on Uranus before 2006, when the first such feature dubbed Uranus Dark Spot was imaged. The speculation is that Uranus is becoming more Neptune-like during its equinoctial season.

The tracking of numerous cloud features allowed determination of zonal winds blowing in the upper troposphere of Uranus. At the equator winds are retrograde, which means that they blow in the reverse direction to the planetary rotation. Wind speeds increase with the distance from the equator, reaching zero values near ±20° latitude, where the troposphere's temperature minimum is located. Closer to the poles, the winds shift to a prograde direction, flowing with Uranus's rotation. Wind speeds continue to increase reaching maxima at ±60° latitude before falling to zero at the poles. Because the collar obscures all clouds below that parallel, speeds between it and the southern pole are impossible to measure.

Seasonal variation 

For a short period from March to May 2004, large clouds appeared in the Uranian atmosphere, giving it a Neptune-like appearance. On 23 August 2006, researchers at the Space Science Institute (Boulder, Colorado) and the University of Wisconsin observed a dark spot on Uranus's surface, giving scientists more insight into Uranus atmospheric activity. Why this sudden upsurge in activity occurred is not fully known, but it appears that Uranus's extreme axial tilt results in extreme seasonal variations in its weather. Determining the nature of this seasonal variation is difficult because good data on Uranus's atmosphere has existed for less than 84 years, or one full Uranian year. Photometry over the course of half a Uranian year (beginning in the 1950s) has shown regular variation in the brightness in two spectral bands, with maxima occurring at the solstices and minima occurring at the equinoxes. A similar periodic variation, with maxima at the solstices, has been noted in microwave measurements of the deep troposphere begun in the 1960s. Stratospheric temperature measurements beginning in the 1970s also showed maximum values near the 1986 solstice. The majority of this variability is thought to occur owing to changes in the viewing geometry.

There are some indications that physical seasonal changes are happening in Uranus. Although Uranus is known to have a bright south polar region, the north pole is fairly dim, which is incompatible with the model of the seasonal change outlined above. During its previous northern solstice in 1944, Uranus displayed elevated levels of brightness, which suggests that the north pole was not always so dim. This information implies that the visible pole brightens some time before the solstice and darkens after the equinox. Detailed analysis of the visible and microwave data revealed that the periodical changes of brightness are not completely symmetrical around the solstices, which also indicates a change in the meridional albedo patterns. In the 1990s, as Uranus moved away from its solstice, Hubble and ground-based telescopes revealed that the south polar cap darkened noticeably (except the southern collar, which remained bright), whereas the northern hemisphere demonstrated increasing activity, such as cloud formations and stronger winds, bolstering expectations that it should brighten soon. This indeed happened in 2007 when it passed an equinox: a faint northern polar collar arose, and the southern collar became nearly invisible, although the zonal wind profile remained slightly asymmetric, with northern winds being somewhat slower than southern.

The mechanism of these physical changes is still not clear. Near the summer and winter solstices, Uranus's hemispheres lie alternately either in full glare of the Sun's rays or facing deep space. The brightening of the sunlit hemisphere is thought to result from the local thickening of the methane clouds and haze layers located in the troposphere. The bright collar at −45° latitude is also connected with methane clouds. Other changes in the southern polar region can be explained by changes in the lower cloud layers. The variation of the microwave emission from Uranus is probably caused by changes in the deep tropospheric circulation, because thick polar clouds and haze may inhibit convection. Now that the spring and autumn equinoxes are arriving on Uranus, the dynamics are changing and convection can occur again.

Formation 

It is argued that the differences between the ice giants and the gas giants arise from their formation history. The Solar System is hypothesised to have formed from a rotating disk of gas and dust known as the presolar nebula. Much of the nebula's gas, primarily hydrogen and helium, formed the Sun, and the dust grains collected together to form the first protoplanets. As the planets grew, some of them eventually accreted enough matter for their gravity to hold on to the nebula's leftover gas. The more gas they held onto, the larger they became; the larger they became, the more gas they held onto until a critical point was reached, and their size began to increase exponentially. The ice giants, with only a few Earth masses of nebular gas, never reached that critical point. Recent simulations of planetary migration have suggested that both ice giants formed closer to the Sun than their present positions, and moved outwards after formation (the Nice model).

Moons 

Uranus has 27 known natural satellites. The names of these satellites are chosen from characters in the works of Shakespeare and Alexander Pope. The five main satellites are Miranda, Ariel, Umbriel, Titania, and Oberon. The Uranian satellite system is the least massive among those of the giant planets; the combined mass of the five major satellites would be less than half that of Triton (largest moon of Neptune) alone. The largest of Uranus's satellites, Titania, has a radius of only , or less than half that of the Moon, but slightly more than Rhea, the second-largest satellite of Saturn, making Titania the eighth-largest moon in the Solar System. Uranus's satellites have relatively low albedos; ranging from 0.20 for Umbriel to 0.35 for Ariel (in green light). They are ice–rock conglomerates composed of roughly 50% ice and 50% rock. The ice may include ammonia and carbon dioxide.

Among the Uranian satellites, Ariel appears to have the youngest surface, with the fewest impact craters, and Umbriel the oldest. Miranda's past geologic activity is thought to have been driven by tidal heating at a time when its orbit was more eccentric than currently, probably as a result of a former 3:1 orbital resonance with Umbriel. Extensional processes associated with upwelling diapirs are the likely origin of Miranda's 'racetrack'-like coronae. Ariel is thought to have once been held in a 4:1 resonance with Titania.

Uranus has at least one horseshoe orbiter occupying the Sun–Uranus  Lagrangian point—a gravitationally unstable region at 180° in its orbit, 83982 Crantor. Crantor moves inside Uranus's co-orbital region on a complex, temporary horseshoe orbit.
 is also a promising Uranus horseshoe librator candidate.

Rings 

The Uranian rings are composed of extremely dark particles, which vary in size from micrometres to a fraction of a metre. Thirteen distinct rings are presently known, the brightest being the ε ring. All except two rings of Uranus are extremely narrow – they are usually a few kilometres wide. The rings are probably quite young; the dynamics considerations indicate that they did not form with Uranus. The matter in the rings may once have been part of a moon (or moons) that was shattered by high-speed impacts. From numerous pieces of debris that formed as a result of those impacts, only a few particles survived, in stable zones corresponding to the locations of the present rings.

William Herschel described a possible ring around Uranus in 1789. This sighting is generally considered doubtful, because the rings are quite faint, and in the two following centuries none were noted by other observers. Still, Herschel made an accurate description of the epsilon ring's size, its angle relative to Earth, its red colour, and its apparent changes as Uranus travelled around the Sun. The ring system was definitively discovered on 10 March 1977 by James L. Elliot, Edward W. Dunham, and Jessica Mink using the Kuiper Airborne Observatory. The discovery was serendipitous; they planned to use the occultation of the star SAO 158687 (also known as HD 128598) by Uranus to study its atmosphere. When their observations were analysed, they found that the star had disappeared briefly from view five times both before and after it disappeared behind Uranus. They concluded that there must be a ring system around Uranus. Later they detected four additional rings. The rings were directly imaged when Voyager 2 passed Uranus in 1986. Voyager 2 also discovered two additional faint rings, bringing the total number to eleven.

In December 2005, the Hubble Space Telescope detected a pair of previously unknown rings. The largest is located twice as far from Uranus as the previously known rings. These new rings are so far from Uranus that they are called the "outer" ring system. Hubble also spotted two small satellites, one of which, Mab, shares its orbit with the outermost newly discovered ring. The new rings bring the total number of Uranian rings to 13. In April 2006, images of the new rings from the Keck Observatory yielded the colours of the outer rings: the outermost is blue and the other one red. One hypothesis concerning the outer ring's blue colour is that it is composed of minute particles of water ice from the surface of Mab that are small enough to scatter blue light. In contrast, Uranus's inner rings appear grey.

Exploration 

In 1986, NASA's Voyager 2 interplanetary probe encountered Uranus. This flyby remains the only investigation of Uranus carried out from a short distance and no other visits are planned. Voyager 1 was unable to visit Uranus because investigation of Saturn's moon Titan was considered a priority. This trajectory took Voyager 1 out of the plane of the ecliptic, ending its planetary science mission. Launched in 1977, Voyager 2 made its closest approach to Uranus on 24 January 1986, coming within  of the cloudtops, before continuing its journey to Neptune. The spacecraft studied the structure and chemical composition of Uranus's atmosphere, including its unique weather, caused by its axial tilt of 97.77°. It made the first detailed investigations of its five largest moons and discovered 10 new ones. Voyager 2 examined all nine of the system's known rings and discovered two more. It also studied the magnetic field, its irregular structure, its tilt and its unique corkscrew magnetotail caused by Uranus's sideways orientation.

The possibility of sending the Cassini spacecraft from Saturn to Uranus was evaluated during a mission extension planning phase in 2009, but was ultimately rejected in favour of destroying it in the Saturnian atmosphere. It would have taken about twenty years to get to the Uranian system after departing Saturn. A Uranus orbiter and probe was recommended by the 2013–2022 Planetary Science Decadal Survey published in 2011; the proposal envisages launch during 2020–2023 and a 13-year cruise to Uranus. A Uranus entry probe could use Pioneer Venus Multiprobe heritage and descend to 1–5 atmospheres. The ESA evaluated a "medium-class" mission called Uranus Pathfinder. A New Frontiers Uranus Orbiter has been evaluated and recommended in the study, The Case for a Uranus Orbiter. Such a mission is aided by the ease with which a relatively big mass can be sent to the systemover 1500 kg with an Atlas 521 and 12-year journey. For more concepts see proposed Uranus missions.

In April, 2022, the next Planetary Science Decadal Survey placed its highest priority for the next "flagship" project on a full package mission (orbiter and probe) to Uranus, with a projected launch window starting in 2031. The "dearth" of ice giant science was key to its prioritization. Another key issue was that such a mission would use extant technology, and not require development of other instruments and systems to be successful.

In culture 

 In astrology, the planet Uranus (symbol ) is the ruling planet of Aquarius. Because Uranus is cyan and Uranus is associated with electricity, the colour electric blue, which is close to cyan, is associated with the sign Aquarius (see Uranus in astrology).
 The chemical element uranium, discovered in 1789 by the German chemist Martin Heinrich Klaproth, was named after the then-newly discovered Uranus.
 Lydia Sigourney included her poem  in her 1827 collection of poetry.
 "Uranus, the Magician" is a movement in Gustav Holst's orchestral suite The Planets, written between 1914 and 1916.
 Operation Uranus was the successful military operation in World War II by the Red Army to take back Stalingrad and marked the turning point in the land war against the Wehrmacht.
 The lines "Then felt I like some watcher of the skies/When a new planet swims into his ken", from John Keats's "On First Looking into Chapman's Homer", are a reference to Herschel's discovery of Uranus.
 In English language popular culture, humor is often derived from the common pronunciation of Uranus's name, which resembles that of the phrase "your anus".

See also 

 Colonisation of Uranus
 Extraterrestrial diamonds (thought to be abundant in Uranus)
 Outline of Uranus
 Stats of planets in the Solar System
 Uranus in astrology
 Uranus in fiction

Notes

References

Further reading

External links 

 Uranus at European Space Agency
 Uranus at NASA's Solar System Exploration site
 Uranus at Jet Propulsion Laboratory's planetary photojournal (photos)
 Voyager at Uranus  (photos)
 Uranian system montage (photo)
 
 Interactive 3D gravity simulation of the Uranian system 

 
17810313
Discoveries by William Herschel
Tauri, 034
Gas giants
Ice giants
Objects observed by stellar occultation
Outer planets